Maître après Dieu (German title: Schiff ohne Hafen) is a 1951 French film directed by Louis Daquin. It stars Pierre Brasseur and Yvette Etiévant.

External links

1951 films
1950s French-language films
Films directed by Louis Daquin
Films based on Dutch novels
French films based on plays
Films set in Hamburg
Seafaring films
French drama films
1951 drama films
French black-and-white films
1950s French films